A former Colonel in Fatah, Mahmood Abo Shandi was deported from Canada for his militant connections.

He arrived in Canada on a forged passport in 1991, and was immediately detained since he acknowledged membership in the PLO and sought residence in the country on the basis that his life was in danger from the Israeli Mossad agency.

References

Palestine Liberation Organization members
Living people
Fatah members
Year of birth missing (living people)
Place of birth missing (living people)